The 1971 Kangaroo Tour of New Zealand was a mid-season tour of New Zealand by the Australia national rugby league team. The Australians played three matches on tour, including a test against the New Zealand national rugby league team. The tour began on 22 June and finished on 29 June.

Leadership 
Harry Bath was the coach of the squad, which he had been since 1968 in this particular tenure. St. George Dragons fullback Graeme Langlands was named captain for the tour ahead of 1969 New Zealand Tour leader John Sattler.

Touring squad 
All but three members of the squad played in the New South Wales Rugby League premiership, those players being Wayne Bennett, Brian Fitzsimmons and Jim Murphy. Several tour members represented the Australia national rugby league team but only played in minor matches in New Zealand.

|- bgcolor="#CCCCFF"
| Player
| Club
| Position(s)
| Games
| Tests
| Tries
| Goals
| F/Goals
| Points
|-
|- bgcolor="#FFFFFF"
| Barry Beath
|  St. George
| 
| 2
| 
| 
| 
| 
| 
|-
|- bgcolor=#FFC0CB
| Wayne Bennett
|  All Whites
| 
| 2
| 
| 1
| 
| 
| 3
|-
|- bgcolor="#FFFFFF"
| Ray Branighan
|  Manly Warringah
| 
| 3
| 1
| 
| 1
| 
| 2
|-
|- bgcolor="#FFFFFF"
| Tony Branson
|  St. George
| 
| 1
| 1
| 
| 
| 
| 
|-
|- bgcolor="#FFFFFF"
| Keith Campbell
|  Parramatta
| 
| 2
| 1
| 1
| 7
| 
| 17
|-
|- bgcolor="#FFFFFF"
| Ron Costello
|  Canterbury-Bankstown
| 
| 2
| 1
| 
| 
| 
| 
|-
|- bgcolor=#FFC0CB
| Brian Fitzsimmons
|  Brothers Brisbane
| 
| 3
| 1
| 
| 
| 
| 
|-
|- bgcolor="#FFFFFF"
| Bob Fulton
|  Manly Warringah
| 
| 3
| 1
| 5
| 
| 
| 15
|-
|- bgcolor="#FFFFFF"
| Bob Grant
|  South Sydney
| 
| 3
| 1
| 
| 
| 
| 
|-
|- bgcolor="#FFFFFF"
| Graeme Langlands (c)
|  St. George
| 
| 1
| 1
| 
| 
| 
| 
|-
|- bgcolor="#FFFFFF"
| Bob McCarthy
|  South Sydney
| 
| 3
| 1
| 2
| 
| 
| 6
|-
|- bgcolor=#FFC0CB
| Jim Murphy
|  Western Suburbs
| 
| 2
| 
| 
| 
| 
| 
|-
|- bgcolor="#FFFFFF"
| Bob O'Reilly
|  Parramatta
| 
| 2
| 1
| 1
| 
| 
| 3
|-
|- bgcolor="#FFFFFF"
| Tom Raudonikis
|  Western Suburbs
| 
| 2
| 
| 
| 
| 
| 
|-
|- bgcolor="#FFFFFF"
| Paul Sait
|  South Sydney
| 
| 2
| 1
| 
| 
| 
| 
|-
|- bgcolor="#FFFFFF"
| John Sattler
|  South Sydney
| 
| 1
| 1
| 
| 
| 
| 
|-
|- bgcolor="#FFFFFF"
| Geoff Starling
|  Balmain
| 
| 2
| 
| 1
| 
| 
| 3
|-
|- bgcolor="#FFFFFF"
| Lionel Williamson
|  Newtown
| 
| 3
| 1
| 1
| 
| 
| 2
|-

Tour 
The Australians played three matches on the tour, winning one match and losing two, including the test match.

Test

References 

Australia national rugby league team tours
Rugby league tours of New Zealand
Kangaroo tour of New Zealand
Kangaroo tour of New Zealand